Kajaru (also Romanized as Kajārū) is a village in Neh Rural District, in the Central District of Nehbandan County, South Khorasan Province, Iran. At the 2006 census, its population was 16, in 5 families.

References 

Populated places in Nehbandan County